The Redding Area Bus Authority, or RABA, is the operator of public transportation in Shasta County, California. RABA was formerly known as The Ride. Ten local routes serve the cities of Redding, Anderson, and Shasta Lake and their surrounding regions, with over 650,000 riders taking advantage of public transportation each year. Buses operate 6 days per week and stops are located at approximately quarter mile intervals. An eleventh route, the Burney Express, serves as a limited-stop weekday commuter line, operating three times per day in each direction. Burney Express is operated for Shasta County by RABA. RABA was formed in 1976 by a joint powers agreement (JPA) between the City of Redding and the County of Shasta to provide public transit services within the Greater Redding Area. RABA began services in November 1981. As the population of Redding exploded in the 1990s, service was greatly expanded. The JPA was amended in 1998 to include the City of Anderson and the City of Shasta Lake. The service is administered by the City of Redding and operated by Transdev.

Route list 
1 – Masonic Ave to Shasta Lake
2 – Downtown to Buenaventura
3 – Downtown to Grandview
4 – Canby Rd to Loma Vista
5 – Downtown to Hartnell
6 – Downtown to El Vista via Canby Rd
7 – Masonic Ave to Canby Rd via Shasta College
9 – Downtown to Anderson
11 – Downtown to Canby Rd via Cypress
14 – Downtown to Canby Rd via Masonic Ave
Burney Express

External links 
 RABA

Bus transportation in California
Redding, California
Transdev
Transportation in Shasta County, California